Alena Kučerová (born 1935) is a Czech printmaker.

Life 
A native of Prague, Kučerová studied at that city's Advanced School of Graphic Art from 1950 until 1954. From 1955 until 1959 she attended the Prague Academy of Applied Arts.

Work 
In the 1960s she began using the traditional medium of printmaking in an experimental manner.  She is especially noted for her technique of building the image using dots before incorporating other forms. Around 1965 she began perforating metal with a shoemaker's awl, printing the motifs created and also exhibiting the perforated tin matrixes as art in their own right. Many of the perforated tins exhibit figurative references. Further experimentation with materials and strong color led her to embrace the aesthetics of Pop Art.

Five works by Kučerová are in the collection of the National Gallery of Art. Two are owned by the Museum of Modern Art, and one is held by the Art Institute of Chicago.

Awards and distinctions

 Biennale des Jeunes, Paris, mention d'honneur (1965)
 Premio internazionale Biella per l'incisione, Italy (1967)
 Award of the Czech Writers' Association (1967)
 Cena Vladimíra Boundníka, Foundation Inter-Kontakt-Grafik, Czech Republic (1997)

References

1935 births
Living people
Czech printmakers
Women printmakers
20th-century Czech artists
20th-century printmakers
20th-century Czech women artists
21st-century Czech artists
21st-century printmakers
21st-century Czech women artists
Artists from Prague
Academy of Arts, Architecture and Design in Prague alumni